Men's Super G World Cup 1993/1994

Final point standings

In Men's Super G World Cup 1993/94 all results count. Jan Einar Thorsen won the cup with only one race win. All races were won by a different athlete.

Note:

In the last race only the best racers were allowed to compete and only the best 15 finishers were awarded with points.

References
 fis-ski.com

World Cup
FIS Alpine Ski World Cup men's Super-G discipline titles